Asterina  may refer to:
 Asterina (starfish), a starfish genus in the family Asterinidae
 Asterina (fungus), a fungus genus in the family Asterinaceae